Richard Severn Sprague (November 13, 1931 – May 28, 2008) was an American football player. He played college football for the Washington Huskies football team and, as a sophomore, was selected by the Football Writers Association of America as a first-team defensive player on their 1950 College Football All-America Team. Sprague passed on an opportunity to play in the National Football League to study law at Harvard Law School.  At Harvard, he also coached football.  He worked as an attorney at the Bogle and Gates law firm for 40 years and at Kemper Development Co. in Bellevue, Washington, for several years after that.  He died of prostate cancer in 2008 at age 77 at his home in Medina, Washington.

See also
 Washington Huskies football statistical leaders

References

1931 births
2008 deaths
American football defensive backs
Washington Huskies football players
Players of American football from Spokane, Washington
Harvard Law School alumni
People from Medina, Washington